is a city located in Yamaguchi Prefecture, Japan on the Seto Inland Sea. As of October 2016, the city has an estimated population of 168,398 and a population density of 590 persons per km2.

History
 as a modern municipality was established in Yamaguchi's Asa District as part of the modernization of municipalities in most prefectures in 1889. It became  on November 1, 1921 in a rare direct elevation from village to city, without being a town in between.

Previously a coal mining town, the city has developed an effective policy to improve its environment.  In particular it has combated the problem of air pollution and its success in doing so saw it being recognised by the United Nations Environment Programme as among UNEP's Global 500 Roll of Honour in 1997.

On November 1, 2004, the town of Kusunoki (from Asa District) was merged into Ube. This brought the city to its current extent, together with previous municipal mergers (Fujiyama in 1931, Kōnan in 1941, Nishi- (West) Kiwa in 1943, Great Shōwa mergers/1954: Kotō, Futamatase, Ono, Higashi- (East) Kiwa).

Geography

Climate

Attractions 

Ube publicizes itself as "a city of greenery, flowers, and sculptures".  Tokiwa Park is the centerpiece of this marketing, as it covers a large area near the center of the city and houses a large number of modern, mostly domestic sculptures on the shores of Lake Tokiwa.  The sculptures can be found around the city.  A sculpture competition is held biennially to provide new additions.

A well-known attraction of the park was a great white pelican called "Katta-kun", so named after his parents who were from Kolkata, India. Hatched in the park in 1985, he became famous as he began visiting schools in the vicinity. Katta-kun died in 2008, but there are a number of pelicans still residing in an enclosure there. In addition to the pelicans there were many mute swans and black swans residing there until 2011, when they were culled after an outbreak of H1N5 avian influenza. Two new mute swans were introduced in 2017.

There is a coal mining museum with a view over the city and airport.

Twin towns – sister cities

Ube is twinned with:
 Castellón de la Plana, Spain
 Newcastle, Australia (1980)
 Weihai, China

Festivals
Ube holds two festivals each year, one in May and the other in November featuring food stands and carnival games.

Transportation

Air
Yamaguchi Ube Airport
The city is served by Yamaguchi Prefecture's only airport, Yamaguchi Ube Airport, with daily flights to and from Tokyo.

Rail
Shinkansen (bullet train)
There are no Shinkansen stations in this city. The closest Shinkansen stations are: Asa Station (Sanyo Onoda) and
Shin-Yamaguchi Station (Yamaguchi)
West Japan Railway lines
San'yō Main Line
Ube Line
Onoda Line

The main train station located in 'downtown' Ube is called Ube-Shinkawa Station (Ube Line). Ube Station is farther inland and is located in a more suburban area known as Kōnan (厚南).

Education

Universities 
Yamaguchi University (national)
School of Medicine
Faculty of Engineering
Ube Frontier University (private)

Primary and secondary schools

The city formerly had a North Korean school, Ube Korean Elementary and Junior High School (宇部朝鮮初中級学校).

Economy and industry
Ube Industries is headquartered and has major plants in Ube. Also, petroleum product company of Solato, printer machine product company of Riso Kagaku, glass product company Central Glass, semiconductor and parts product company of Renesas, pharmaceutical research and product company of Kyowa Hakko Kirin, clinical laboratory research company of Miraca Holdings are plant and factory base on Ube.

People from Ube 
 Masaki Kito, attorney at law
 Naoto Kan, former prime minister of Japan
 Tadashi Yanai, founder and president of Uniqlo
 Kazuo Hara, documentary film director
 Hideaki Anno, animator and film director
 Yoji Yamada, film director
 Aimi Kobayashi, pianist
 Shunsuke Kiyokiba, pop singer (formerly vocalist of Exile)
 Satomi', pop singer
 Sayumi Michishige, pop singer (former Morning Musume member)
 Tomomi Nishimura, actress
 Kishō Taniyama, voice actor
 Hitomi Harada, voice actress and singer
 Norihiro Akimura, baseball player
 Makiko Horai, volleyball player
 Sotaro Yasunaga, soccer player
 Daisuke Tomita, soccer player
 Yuji Nakagawa, soccer player
 Ryota Takasugi, soccer player

References

External links 

  
 

Cities in Yamaguchi Prefecture
Port settlements in Japan
Populated coastal places in Japan
1921 establishments in Japan
Populated places established in 1921